An high-altitude platform station (HAPS, which can also mean high-altitude pseudo-satellite or high-altitude platform systems) or atmospheric satellite is a long endurance, high altitude aircraft able to offer observation or communication services similarly to artificial satellites. Mostly unmanned aerial vehicles (UAVs), they remain aloft through atmospheric lift, either aerodynamic like airplanes, or aerostatic like airships or balloons.

High-altitude long endurance (HALE) military drones can fly above 60,000 ft (18,000 m) over 32 hours, while civil HAPS are radio stations at an altitude of 20 to 50 km above a fixed point.

High-altitude, long endurance flight is studied since at least 1983, and demonstrator programs followed since  1994.

Hydrogen and solar power are proposed as alternatives to conventional engines. 
Above commercial air transport and wind turbulence, at high altitudes, drag as well as lift are reduced.

HAPS could be used for weather monitoring, as a radio relay, for oceanography or earth imaging, for border security, maritime patrol and anti-piracy operations, disaster response, or agricultural observation.

While reconnaissance aircraft could reach high altitudes since the 1950s, their endurance is limited.
Very few HALE aircraft are operational like the Northrop Grumman RQ-4 Global Hawk.
There are many solar powered, lightweight prototypes like the NASA Pathfinder/Helios, or the Airbus Zephyrn having fly 64 days, while many are not as advanced.
Conventional aviation fuels are used in prototypes since 1970 and can reach an endurance of 60 hours like the Boeing Condor.
hydrogen aircraft can even fly longer, a week or longer, like the AeroVironment Global Observer

Stratospheric airships are often presented as a competition, but if a few prototypes were built, none is operational yet.

Flying in the stratosphere, the most well known ballon high-endurance project is Google Loon, using helium-filled high-altitude balloons.

Definitions

 High-altitude long endurance (HALE)
This is above and longer than Medium-Altitude, Long-Endurance (MALE) aircraft flying between  during 24 hours, more vulnerable to anti-aircraft defense, like the USAF ISR/strike MQ-9 Reaper or its variants.

 High-altitude platform station (HAPS) 
 defined by the International Telecommunication Union (ITU) as "a station on an object at an altitude of 20 to 50 km and at a specified, nominal, fixed point relative to the Earth" in its ITU Radio Regulations (RR). HAPS can also be the abbreviation for high-altitude pseudo-satellite.

Studies

In 1983, Lockheed produced A Preliminary Study of solar powered aircraft and Associated Power Trains for the NASA, as long endurance flight could be compared to suborbital spacecraft. In 1984 was published the Design of Long Endurance Unmanned Airplanes Incorporating Solar and fuel cell propulsion report. In 1989, the Design and experimental results for a high-altitude, long-endurance airfoil report proposed applications as a radio relay, for weather monitoring or cruise missile targeting.

The NASA ERAST Program (Environmental Research Aircraft and Sensor Technology) was started in September 1994 to study high-altitude UAVs, and was terminated in 2003.
In July 1996, the USAF Strikestar 2025 report forecast HALE UAVs maintaining air occupation with 24 hours flights.
The Defense Airborne Reconnaissance Office made demonstrations of long-endurance UAV craft.
In September 1996, Israel Aircraft Industries detailed the design of a HALE UAV.

In 2002 was published Preliminary reliability design of a solar-powered high-altitude very long endurance unmanned air vehicle by G. Frulla.
The European Union CAPECON project aimed to develop HALE vehicles, the Polish Academy of Sciences proposed its PW-114 concept to fly at  during 40 hours.
Luminati Aerospace proposed its Substrata solar-powered aircraft flying in formation like migratory geese to reduce by 79% the power required for the trailing aircraft, allowing smaller airframes remaining aloft indefinitely up to a latitude of 50°.

Design

 Power
 Power is required for continuous operation, limiting endurance by the need for refueling. Persistent solar-powered aircraft need to store daylight energy for the night, in electric batteries, or in fuel cells.

 Altitude selection
Maintaining a position facing variable winds is a challenge. Altitudes above  are also above commercial air transport.

 Comparison to satellites
 A lower altitude covers more effectively a small region, implies a lower telecommunications link budget (a 34 dB advantage over a LEO, 66 dB over GEO), a lower power consumption, and a smaller round-trip delay. Satellites are more expensive, take longer to deploy, and cannot be reasonably accessed for maintenance. A satellite in the vacuum of space orbits due to its high speed generating a centrifugal force matching the gravity. Changing a satellite orbit requires expending its extremely limited fuel supply.

Applications

Atmospheric satellites could be used for weather monitoring, as a radio relay, for oceanography or earth imaging like an orbital satellite for a fraction of the cost. Other uses include border security, maritime patrol and anti-piracy operations, disaster response, or agricultural observation.
They could bring internet connectivity to the 5 billion people lacking it, either with 11,000 airplane UAVs or with balloons like Google’s Project Loon.

 Radiocommunication services
HAPS could deliver bandwidth and capacity similar to a broadband wireless access network, like WiMAX, over a coverage area similar to that of a satellite. Military communications can be improved in remote areas like in Afghanistan, where mountainous terrain interferes with communications signals.

 Surveillance and intelligence
 The Northrop Grumman RQ-4 Global Hawk UAV is used by the US Air Force for surveillance and security. It carries a radar, optical, and infrared imagers; and is able to transmit its data in realtime.

 Real-time monitoring
 An area could be monitored for flood detection, seismic monitoring, remote sensing and disaster management.

 Weather and environmental monitoring
 For environment and weather monitoring, high-altitude balloons can deploy scientific equipment to measure environmental changes or to keep track of weather. In partnership with The National Oceanic and Atmospheric Administration (NOAA), NASA has started using Global Hawk UAVs to study Earth's atmosphere.

 Rocket launch
Mass drivers have been proposed for launching to orbit.

Airplanes

Reconnaissance aircraft like the late 1950s Lockheed U-2 could fly above  and the 1964 SR-71 above .
The twin-turbofan powered Myasishchev M-55 reached an altitude of 21,360 m (70,080 ft) in 1993, a variant of the M-17 first flown in 1982, which reached 21,830 m (71,620 ft) in 1990.

Operational

 Grob G 520 Egrett
 The manned Grob G 520 first flew on 24 June 1987 and was certified in 1991.

 Northrop Grumman RQ-4 Global Hawk
 The Northrop Grumman RQ-4 Global Hawk first flew on 28 February 1998 and was put into USAF service in 2001. The 131 ft (40 m) wide, 48 ft (14.5 m) long RQ-4 is powered by a single Rolls-Royce F137 turbofan, weighs up to 32,250 lb (14.6 t) at takeoff, and carries a 3,000 lb (1,360 kg) payload up to 60,000 ft (18,300 m) over more than 34 hours. It can be used as a radio relay and can carry electro-optical, infrared, synthetic aperture radar (SAR), and high and low band SIGINT sensors. A total 42 of them have been in service with the United States Air Force. It is the basis for the US Navy's MQ-4C Triton.

 Guizhou WZ-7 Soaring Dragon
 The Guizhou WZ-7 Soaring Dragon, produced by Guizhou Aircraft Industry Corporation, is a HALE UAV used for military reconnaissance, in PLAAF service since at least 2018. It has a service ceiling of 18 km and range of 7,000 km.

 Bayraktar Akıncı

Prototypes

Solar powered 

 AeroVironment/NASA Pathfinder
 The HALSOL prototype, a 185 kg (410 lb), 30 m (98.4 ft) wide flying wing propelled by eight electric motors, first flew in June 1983. It joined the NASA ERAST Program in late 1993 as the Pathfinder, and with solar cells covering the entire wing added later, it reached  on September 11, 1995 and then  in 1997.

 AeroVironment/NASA Centurion/Helios Prototype
It was modified into the Helios Prototype, with a sixth  wing section for a  span, and a fifth landing gear and systems pod. It first flew in late 1999, solar panels were added in 2000 and it reached  on August 13, 2001. A production aircraft would fly for up to six months. It broke up in flight in 2003.

 Airbus Zephyr
 The Zephyr were originally designed by QinetiQ, a commercial offshoot of the UK Ministry of Defence. The UAVs are powered by solar cells, recharging batteries in daylight to stay aloft at night. The earliest model flew in December 2005. In March 2013, the project was sold to Airbus Defence and Space. In the summer of 2022, it flew during 64 days.

 Solar Impulse
 The first Solar Impulse manned demonstrator made its first flight on 3 December 2009, and flew an entire diurnal solar cycle in a July 2010 26-hour flight. The 71.9 m (236 ft) wide, 2.3 tonnes (5,100 lb) Solar Impulse 2 first flew on 2 June 2014, it could reach 12,000 m (39,000 ft) and its longest flight was from Nagoya, Japan to Kalaeloa, Hawaii over 117 h 52 min on 28 June 2015.

 Titan Aerospace Solara
 Founded in 2012 in New Mexico, Titan Aerospace was developing large solar-powered, high-altitude atmospheric satellites similar to the AeroVironment Global Observer or QinetiQ Zephyr. Costing less than $2 million, they could carry a  payload for up to five years, limited by battery deterioration. In 2013, Titan was flying two fifth-scale test models and aimed to flight test a full-sized prototype by 2014. In March 2014, Facebook was interested in the company, led at the time by Eclipse Aviation founder Vern Raburn, for $60 million. Google bought Titan Aerospace in April 2014, managed to fly a prototype in May 2015 but it crashed within minutes and Titan Aerospace was shut down by early 2017.

 KARI EAV

 Astigan A3
OS owns 51% of UK company Astigan, led by Brian Jones, developing the A3 since 2014 with scale model test flights in 2015 and full-scale low-altitude flights in 2016. High-altitude flights should begin in 2019, to complete tests in 2020 with a commercial introduction as for environmental monitoring, mapping, communications and security. In March 2021, the project was ended as no strategic partner was found.

 Facebook Aquila
 The Facebook Aquila UAV was a carbon fiber, solar-powered flying wing UAV spanning  and weighing , designed to stay aloft at FL650 for 90 days. It was designed and manufactured by UK company Ascenta for Facebook, to provide internet connectivity. UAVs would use Laser communication between them and to ground stations. On June 28, 2016, it took its first flight, during ninety minutes and reaching , but a twenty-foot section of the righthand wing broke off during final approach. It made another low-altitude test flights in 2017. On June 27, 2018, Facebook announced it will halt the project and plan to have other companies build the drones.

 China Aerospace Science and Technology Corporation
 China Aerospace Science and Technology Corporation flew a -span solar-powered UAV to FL650 in a 15 hours test flight in July 2017.

 Lavochkin LA-252
 Russia's Lavochkin design bureau is flight-testing the LA-252, an -span,  solar-powered UAV designed to stay aloft 100 days in the stratosphere.

 UAVOS ApusDuo
 American UAV manufacturer UAVOS first flew the ApusDuo in October 2018.

 AeroVironment HAPSMobile
 AeroVironment will design and development solar-powered UAV prototypes for $65 million for HAPSMobile, a joint venture 95% funded and owned by Japanese telco SoftBank.

 BAE Systems PHASA-35
 Designed by Prismatic Ltd., now BAE Systems, the 35 m (115 ft)-wingspan BAE Systems PHASA-35 made its maiden flight in February 2020 from the Woomera Test Range in South Australia; it should fly its  payload at around 70,000 ft for days or weeks.

 Swift Engineering SULE
 The Swift Engineering's Swift Ultra Long Endurance SULE completed its maiden flight partnership with NASA's Ames Research Center in July 2020.

 Aurora Odysseus
 Aurora Flight Sciences announced its Odysseus in November 2018. It was designed to stay above  up to three months at latitudes up to 20°. Its first flight was indefinitely delayed by July 2019.

Hydrocarbon fueled 

 USAF Compass Dwell and Compass Cope
 The USAF Compass Dwell UAV program saw the flight of the LTV XQM-93 in February 1970, based on a turboprop-powered Schweizer SGS 2-32 sailplane and designed to fly 24 hours and to reach 50,000 ft (15,240 m); and the Martin Marietta Model 845 in April 1972, based on a piston engine-powered Schweizer SGS 1-34 sailplane, designed to reach 40,000 feet (12,000 m) and capable to fly 28 hours. The following Compass Cope program saw the Boeing YQM-94 B-Gull first flight on 28 July 1973: powered by a General Electric J97 turbojet, it was designed to fly 30 hours up to 70,000 ft (21,340 m), and managed to fly during 17.4 hours and up to 55,000 feet (16,800 m); the competing Ryan YQM-98 R-Tern was powered by a Garrett ATF3 turbofan, first flew on 17 August 1974 and was designed to fly during 30 hours.

 Boeing Condor

 Aurora Perseus and Theseus
Designed to fly at 62,000 ft (18.9 km) and up to 24 hours, Perseus B first flew on 7 October 1994 and reached  on June 27, 1998. It has a  maximum weight, is able to carry a  payload and its  wing has a high 26:1 aspect ratio. A larger follow-on powered by two Rotax 912 piston engines, the Theseus first flew on May 24, 1996. Designed to fly during 50 hours up to 65,000 ft (20,000 m), the 5,500 (2.5 t) maximum weight UAV was 140 ft (42.7 m) wide and could carry a 340 kg (750 lb) payload.

 Grob Strato 2C
 Designed to fly at 24,000 m (78,700 ft) and for up to 48 hours, the manned Grob Strato 2C first flew on 31 March 1995 and reached 18,552 m (60,897 ft). The 56.5 m (185 ft) wide aircraft was powered by two 300 kW (400 hp) piston engines turbocharged by a PW127 turboprop as the gas generator.

 Lockheed Martin RQ-3 DarkStar
 The Lockheed Martin RQ-3 DarkStar is a high-stealth oriented craft built to function optimally within highly defended areas, in order to do reconnaissance. The craft is intended to hover over targets for at least eight hours, at heights of 13.7 km (45,000 ft) and beyond.

 General Atomics ALTUS
They led to the larger, turboprop-powered General Atomics Altair.

 Scaled Composites Proteus
 The manned Scaled Composites Proteus operates at altitudes of 19.8 km (65,000 ft), while carrying a  payload.

 Virgin Atlantic GlobalFlyer
 The manned GlobalFlyer, built by Scaled Composites, was designed to fly around the world. Powered by a single Williams FJ44, the 114 ft (35 m) wide aircraft can weigh up to 22,100 lb (10 t). Having a 50,700 ft (15,450 m) ceiling, it flew for 76 hours and 45 minutes in February 2006.

 Aurora Flight Sciences Orion

 Shenyang Aircraft Corporation Divine Eagle
 The Divine Eagle, produced by Shenyang Aircraft Corporation, is a large turbofan-powered UAV developed since 2012 and possibly in service by 2018.

Hydrogen fueled 

 AeroVironment Global Observer
After a crash in April 2011, the Pentagon shelved the project.

 Boeing Phantom Eye
 An evolution of the Boeing Condor developed by Boeing Phantom Works, the Boeing Phantom Eye first flew in June 2012. Powered by two  turbocharged Ford 2.3 liter piston engines running on liquid hydrogen, the 150 ft (46 m) wide UAV has a gross takeoff weight of 9,800 lbs (4.4 t) and can carry a  payload. A full size variant is designed to carry a  payload during ten days. In August 2016, the Phantom Eye demonstrator was transferred to the Air Force Flight Test Museum.

 Stratospheric Platforms

Airships 

Unmanned Stratospheric airships are designed to operate at very high 60,000 to 75,000 feet (18.3 to 22.9 km) altitudes during weeks, months or years.
Subitted to ultraviolet damage, ozone corrosion and challenging station keeping, they can be solar-powered with energy storage for the night.

The first stratospheric powered airship flight took place in 1969, reaching  for 2 hours with a  payload.
By August 2002, US company Worldwide Aeros was building a stratospheric demonstrator for the Korea Aerospace Research Institute, as a part the South Korean HAA development program.
By April 2004, stratospheric airships were being developed in USA, UK, Canada, Korea and Japan.
In May 2004, the Japan Aerospace Exploration Agency shown its test airship in Taiki, Hokkaido, a part of its Stratosphere Platform Project.

 SwRI HiSentinel

 Integrated Sensor Is Structure

 Lockheed-Martin HAA
 The United States Department of Defense Missile Defense Agency contracted Lockheed Martin to build an unmanned High-Altitude Airship (HAA) for its Ballistic Missile Defense System. In January 2006, Lockheed won a $149M Contract to build it and demonstrate its technical feasibility and military utility. It would operate above  in a quasi-geostationary position to deliver persistent orbital station keeping as a surveillance aircraft platform, telecommunications relay, or a  weather observer. Powered by solar cells, it would stay in the air for up to one month and was intended to survey a  diameter of land.

 Lockheed-Martin HALE-D
 On July 27, 2011, the "High Altitude Long Endurance-Demonstrator" (HALE-D) subscale demonstrator was launched on a test flight. At  a problem with the helium levels prevented it and the flight was terminated. It descended and crashed in a Pennsylvania forest. Two days after, it was destroyed by a fire before its recovery. 

 Lindstrand HALE airship
 Lindstrand Technologies designed a Helium-filled non-rigid airship covered with solar cells. The  aircraft could carry a  payload during 3 to 5 years as helium loss would be minimal at high altitudes. For energy storage, a 180kW electrolyser would fill H2 and O2 tanks, to be converted back to water by a 150kW fuel cell. A  motor would allow a  maximum speed.

 Thales Alenia Stratobus

 H-Aero
 H-Aero LTA-based launch systems for Mars exploration, with development taking place via terrestrial high-altitude platforms. The first systems were tested by 2021.

Balloons

A geostationary balloon satellite (GBS) flies in the stratosphere ( above sea level) at a fixed point over the Earth's surface. At that altitude the air has 1/10 of its density is at sea level.
A GBS could be used to provide broadband Internet access over a large area.
One prior project was the Google's Project Loon, which envisioned using helium-filled high-altitude balloons.

Rotorcraft
 Boeing A160 Hummingbird
 The Boeing A160 Hummingbird is a rotorcraft produced by Boeing. First flown in 2002, the program had goals of a 24-hour endurance, and 30,000 ft (9,100 m) altitude, but was abandoned in December 2012.

References

Further reading
 
  
 
 
 

Unmanned aerial vehicles
Emerging technologies
 
Radio stations and systems ITU
Airships
Airship configurations